James Cook (born 7 January 1974) is a former Australian rules footballer who played for Carlton, the Western Bulldogs and Melbourne in the Australian Football League (AFL). Attended St Virgils College in Hobart.

Carlton
Cook played at North Hobart while still a teenager and was recruited by Carlton with the second pick of the 1990 AFL draft, which they had gained by trading Warren McKenzie to Sydney. It was Carlton's earliest ever draft pick up until Marc Murphy in 2005.

He had to wait three seasons to make his debut and in just his fourth league game kicked six goals in a win over Sydney at Optus Oval to earn an AFL Rising Star nomination, and better the five goals which he booted against Hawthorn two weeks earlier. His performances for the rest of the season were poor but he was picked in both the Qualifying Final and Semi Finals, where he kicked three and two goals respectively. He made just seven appearances in 1995, a premiership year for Carlton, but was not able to establish a place in the strong forward-line come the finals. At the end of the year, Cook was traded to Footscray in exchange for Ben Sexton.

Western Bulldogs
After struggling in his first year at Footscray, Cook played the best football of his career in 1997, with the club now re-branded the Western Bulldogs. He kicked 36 goals for the season, 17 of them in the final three games as the Bulldogs fell just short of making a Grand Final, to finish third in their goal-kicking behind Simon Minton-Connell and Chris Grant. His run started in round 22 when he kicked seven goals and three behinds against Hawthorn. He then kicked a game high four goals to help his club defeat Sydney in the Qualifying Final, outperforming Swans forward Tony Lockett. Cook then kick six goals in the preliminary final against Adelaide. He could have had seven, but an apple thrown from the crowd disrupted the kick when he went for his seventh goal. This would prove to be costly, as the crows came back to win by two points, ending the Bulldog's season.

In 1998 he kicked 23 goals from 11 appearances and in 1999 he finished with 32 from 19 games. On five occasions during this time he kicked five goals or more but also played many games where he saw little of the ball and he was offloaded to Melbourne in the 1999 Pre-Season draft.

Melbourne
At Melbourne, he only managed three games but won a game against the Kangaroos when he kicked six goals before an ankle injury forced his retirement.

References

Holmesby, Russell and Main, Jim (2007). The Encyclopedia of AFL Footballers. 7th ed. Melbourne: Bas Publishing.
Demon Wiki profile

1974 births
Living people
Carlton Football Club players
Western Bulldogs players
Melbourne Football Club players
North Hobart Football Club players
Australian rules footballers from Tasmania